Panagiotis Dourakos (born 4 November 1952) is a Greek fencer. He competed in the individual épée event at the 1972 Summer Olympics.

References

1952 births
Living people
Greek male épée fencers
Panathinaikos fencers
Olympic fencers of Greece
Fencers at the 1972 Summer Olympics